This is a list of educational institutions located in the district of Jhelum District in Pakistan.

Primary and secondary educational institutions
Air Foundation High School System Jhelum Campus
Army Public School and College
Beaconhouse School System, Main G.T. Road
Falcon House Secondary School Jhelum, Pakistan
Presentation Convent School, Jhelum
St. Thomas' High School, Jhelum
Roots Millennium Schools, Citi Housing Society, Jhelum

Tertiary and quaternary educational institutions

Universities
 University of the Punjab, Jhelum Campus
 Virtual University of Pakistan, Jhelum Campus

Women's degree colleges
 Govt. College for Women, Pind Dadan Khan, District
Govt College For Women, Katchery Road
 Govt. College for Women, Dina, District
Community Model Girls higher Secondary School Sanghoi

Men's degree colleges
 Government Degree College Jhelum
 Govt. Degree College, Talianwala, Jhelum Fahad College
 Govt. Postgraduate College
 Al-Biruni Govt. College, Pind Dadan Khan
 Govt. Degree College, Sohawa
 Govt.  Degree College, Dina

Co-educational colleges
 Federal Govt. College, Mangla Cantt
 Bahria Foundation College, GT Road

Commerce colleges
 Govt. College of Commerce, Bilal Town
 Wings College of Commerce, 4-Civil Lines
 M.A. Jinnah College of Commerce & Computer Science, Al-Bilal Building, Old G.T. Road

Law colleges
 Jinnah Law College near Kutcheri

Medical colleges
 Jhelum Homeopathic Medical College, GT Road Jada
Jhelum Medical College (under process)

References

External links
 District Jhelum Education website
 Air Foundation School System Jhelum

Jhelum
Education in Jhelum
Jhelum
Jhelum